The 1953 Pau Grand Prix was a Formula Two motor race held on 6 April 1953 at the Pau circuit, in Pau, Pyrénées-Atlantiques, France. The Grand Prix was won by Alberto Ascari for the second year running, driving the Ferrari 500. Mike Hawthorn finished second and Harry Schell third.

Classification

Race

References

Pau Grand Prix
1953 in French motorsport